Dayron is a given name. Notable people with the given name include:

Dayron Capetillo (born 1987), Cuban hurdler
Dayron Márquez (born 1983), Colombian javelin thrower
Dayron Robles (born 1986), Cuban track and field athlete 
Dayron Varona (born 1988), Cuban baseball player

See also
Day'Ron Sharpe (born 2001), American basketball player
Dairon, another given name